Sarhul is a spring festival in the Indian state of Jharkhand. The festival is celebrated for three days, from the 3rd day of Chaitra month in Sukla Paksh to Chaitra Purnima. In the festival, the village priest Pahan offers sacrifice of flowers, fruit, vermilion, rooster and tapan (liquor) in Sarna to Sun, village deity and ancestor for good fortune of the village. Then the locals dance holding flowers of the sal tree. It is a symbol of commencement of the new year. According to the tradition, it also symbolises marriage between the Earth and the Sun. It is an important festival observed by the Kurukh and Sadan. Among Kurukh it is known as Khaddi (lit. 'flower') in Kurukh. 

It is  known as Hadi Bonga among the Bhumijs, Mundas. It is known as Baha parab among the Ho and Santal people.

Etymology
Sarhul is the Nagpuri name of the festival. Sar or Sarai refers to the sal tree (Shorea robusta) in Nagpuri and hul means 'collectively', also 'grove'. It symbolises celebrating nature through sal.

Alternative interpretations include:

• Hul may refer to 'revolution', which translates to revolution through the sal flowers.

• Sar means year and hul means begin. It symbolises the beginning of a new year.

The festival
In this festival people worship in Sarna. Ploughing is forbidden on this day. People fast one day before the festival. Young people collect Sal flowers from the nearby forest and catch crabs and fish. On the occasion of festival people go to Sarna by beating of Dhol, Nagara and Madal. People worship the Sal tree. Shalai, the flowers of Sal tree, are offered to deities. The village priest Pahan, sometimes called Laya, and Pujar  offer sacrifice to village deity of Sal flowers, fruit, vermilion, three roosters and Tapan (liquor) for good fortune of village. Pahan sacrifices three roosters of different colours, each for Sun, village deities and ancestors. Pahan put water pot in Sarna and next day forecast about weather for next year. Pahan distributes flower of Sal tree among villagers. People worship souls of their ancestors in their home and offer different food to them. Only after offering foods to souls of their ancestors, they eat food. Then they sing, dance in beat of dhol, nagara and mandar, also drink rice beer Handia.
 
Since year of 1961, procession are being organised in Sarhul festival in Gumla. Before that there was no such procession, people were only dancing near Sarnasthal. In urban area, middle class tribal activist have reinvented nature festival Sahul to mark regional identity while in rural areas it is limited to thanksgiving to deities.

Related festivals in India
There are several festivals which are celebrated as new year across India. Some festival are as follows:
Baha parab, among Ho and Santal people
Rongali Bihu In Assam
Vaisakhi in Punjab, India
Pohela Boishakh in West Bengal, India
Vishu in Kerala

References

Festivals in India
Indian traditions
Festivals in Jharkhand
Nagpuri culture